The Gulf and Caribbean Sea Naval Force is the maritime division of the Mexican Navy, whose primary objective is to safeguard and protect the coastlines and territorial seas of Mexico bordering the Gulf of Mexico and Caribbean Sea. The force was created on the same date as its Pacific counterpart on February 11, 1972.

Current composition
The Naval Force is divided into three Naval Regions, six Naval Zones and five Naval Sectors:
  First Naval Region Northern Gulf (RN-1) – Tuxpan, Veracruz
 First Naval Zone (ZN-1) – Ciudad Madero, Tamaulipas  

 Naval Sector Matamoros, Tamaulipas
 Naval Sector La Pesca, Tamaulipas
 Third Naval Zone (ZN-3) – Veracruz, Veracruz
Naval Sector Coatzacoalcos, Veracruz
 Third Naval Region Campeche (RN-3) – Ciudad del Carmen, Campeche
 Fifth Naval Zone (ZN-5) – Frontera, Tabasco
 Seventh Naval Zone (ZN-7) – Lerma, Campeche
 Naval Sector Champoton, Campeche
 Fifth Naval Region Caribbean (RN-5) – Isla Mujeres, Quintana Roo
 Ninth Naval Zone (ZN-9) Yucalpeten, Yucatán
 Eleventh Naval Zone (ZN-11) – Chetumal, Quintana Roo
 Naval Sector Conzumel, Quintana Roo

See also
Mexican Navy
Pacific Naval Force
Mexican Naval Aviation

External links
  Gulf and Caribbean Sea Naval Force

Military units and formations of Mexico
Mexican Navy
Military units and formations established in 1972